The 2016 Missouri Valley Conference women's basketball tournament is part of the 2015–16 NCAA Division I women's basketball season and was played in Moline, Illinois March 10–13, 2015, at the iWireless Center. The tournament's winner received the Missouri Valley Conference's automatic bid to the 2016 NCAA tournament.

Seeds

Schedule

Tournament bracket

See also
 2016 Missouri Valley Conference men's basketball tournament

References

External links
Missouri Valley Conference Official Website

2015–16 Missouri Valley Conference women's basketball season
Missouri Valley Conference women's basketball tournament